Mozambique competed at the 2016 Summer Olympics in Rio de Janeiro, Brazil, from 5 to 21 August 2016. This was the nation's tenth consecutive appearance at the Summer Olympics.

The Mozambique National Olympic Committee sent a team of six athletes, five men and one woman, to compete in four different sports at the Games. Among the sports represented by the athletes, Mozambique marked its Olympic debut in flatwater canoeing.

The majority of the Mozambican roster made their Olympic debut in Rio de Janeiro, except for hurdler Kurt Couto, who attended his fourth straight Games as the most experienced competitor. Other notable athletes included Dutch-born butterfly swimmer and 2014 Youth Olympian Jannah Sonnenschein, the lone female of the team, and the canoeing tandem of Mussa Chamaune and Joaquim Lobo, who acted as the nation's flag bearer in the opening ceremony.

Mozambique, however, failed to win a single Olympic medal since the 2000 Summer Olympics in Sydney, where middle-distance runner Maria Mutola became the nation's first ever champion in the women's 800 metres.

Athletics (track and field)
 
Mozambican athletes have so far achieved qualifying standards in the following athletics events (up to a maximum of 3 athletes in each event):

Track & road events

Canoeing

Sprint
Mozambique qualified one boat for the men's C-2 1000 m into the Olympic canoeing regatta through the 2016 African Sprint Qualifying Tournament, signifying the nation's Olympic debut in the sport.

Qualification Legend: FA = Qualify to final (medal); FB = Qualify to final B (non-medal)

Judo

Mozambique qualified one judoka for the men's half-middleweight category (81 kg) at the Games. Marlon Acácio earned a continental quota spot from the African region as Mozambique's top-ranked judoka outside of direct qualifying position in the IJF World Ranking List of May 30, 2016.

Swimming

Mozambique received a Universality invitation from FINA to send two swimmers (one male and one female) to the Olympics.

References

External links

 
 

Nations at the 2016 Summer Olympics
2016
Olympics